Alburnus caeruleus, also known as the black spotted bleak or Tigris bleak is a species of ray-finned fish in the carp family, Cyprinidae. It is found in the Queiq River drainage and the Tigris–Euphrates river system in Iran, Iraq, Syria and Turkey.

References

caeruleus
Fish described in 1843